Kenneth "Kenny" Allen (born 8 October 1969) is a British Paralympic archer.

He competed in individual and team recurve in the 2012 Summer Paralympics in London and won his first World Championship medal in Bangkok in 2013.

Biography
Allen was born with spina bifida and lives in Wymondham, Norfolk. During the 2012 Summer Paralympics he set a new Paralympic record with 651 points.

When reclassification took effect in April 2014, Allen was no longer eligible to compete in para-archery under the new rules and decided to focus on able-bodied events instead.

Personal life
Allen is married and has two children.

References

Paralympic archers of Great Britain
Archers at the 2012 Summer Paralympics
Living people
English male archers
1969 births